Fillmore is an unincorporated community in Johnston County, Oklahoma, United States.

History
A post office operated in Fillmore from 1902 to 1965. The community was named after a local resident, Elias Fillmore, who was a Chickasaw.

Notes

Unincorporated communities in Johnston County, Oklahoma
Unincorporated communities in Oklahoma